The United States national athletics  (track and field) team represents the United States in international athletics competitions such as the Olympic Games or the World Athletics Championships.

Medal tables

The United States have 25 participations in the Olympic Games of 26 editions held (the only exception is due to the boycott of Moscow 1980)

Olympic Games
The United States is the nation that has won the most medals in athletics at the Olympic Games, around 795, of which 332 are gold. Their national-level male, took part in all editions of the games already this season, 25 with the exception of Moscow 1980 known for the 1980 boycott, while women 18 editions from Amsterdam 1928.

See also

Summer Olympics medal table
World Athletics Championships medal table
USA Track & Field

References

External links
 United States Athletics at Summer Olympics
 Official site of the USA Track & Field
 Team USA at the Olympic Games

United States
Athletics